Satish Vyas is an Indian santoor player. He is the son of the Indian classical singer C. R. Vyas. From 1978 he studied santoor with Shivkumar Sharma. He lives in Chembur.

Performances 
Pandit Satish Vyas has performed all over the world at prestigious venues. Most recently, he performed at the Aga Khan Museum in Toronto, Canada in 2019 for the Raag-Mala Music Society of Toronto.

Awards
 Padma Shri
 Tansen Samman, 26 December 2020

References

External links
 satishvyas.in – Official Site

1952 births
Hindustani instrumentalists
Living people
Recipients of the Padma Shri in arts
Santoor players
People from Mumbai